Timothy Matthew Howard (born March 6, 1979) is an American former professional soccer player who played as a goalkeeper. He last played for USL Championship club Memphis 901 FC, a club of which he is a minority owner and sporting director. He is also international ambassador in the US for former club Everton. Howard is widely considered to be one of the greatest team-members in American soccer history.
 Howard was named to the 2003–04 PFA Premier League Team of the Year and was awarded the 2009 FIFA Confederations Cup Golden Glove. Referencing the American public's preference for other sports over soccer in contrast to most other countries, the Chicago Tribune described Howard as the "rarest of creatures – an American soccer hero".

Howard began his career with the North Jersey Imperials, before making a move to the MetroStars. His appearances soon attracted the attention of English Premier League club Manchester United, who signed him in 2003. He enjoyed relative success with the club, as they won the 2003 FA Community Shield, the 2003–04 FA Cup and the 2005–06 League Cup. After United signed goalkeeper Edwin van der Sar, however, Howard went out on loan to Everton to play more first-team football, and eventually signed permanently with them in February 2007. On January 4, 2012, Howard scored his first professional goal in a Premier League match against Bolton Wanderers, making him only the fourth goalkeeper to score a goal in the Premier League. In 2016, Howard made his return to MLS, signing for the Colorado Rapids. He played for three years for the Rapids before hanging up his gloves in October 2019. Almost immediately, Howard ramped up his front-office role in USL Championship side Memphis 901 FC and was announced as the club's sporting director in January 2020. He later returned to professional soccer in March 2020, signing a playing contract with the club he co-owned.

Howard is the most capped goalkeeper of all-time for the United States men's national team, with 121 caps since 2002 until his international retirement in 2017. He was an unused substitute for the 2006 FIFA World Cup but later established himself as first-choice keeper of the United States' international tournament games beginning with the 2009 FIFA Confederations Cup, in which the U.S. ended as runner-up against Brazil. Howard participated at both the 2010 and 2014 FIFA World Cups, starting in all their matches. The team reached the Round of 16 on both occasions, and during the latter Howard set a World Cup record for most saves in a match, with 15 against Belgium.

Early life
Howard was born in North Brunswick, New Jersey, the son of African-American truck driver Matthew Howard and his Hungarian wife Esther (née Fekete), who worked for a container packing distributor. His father moved out "before [Howard] formed [his] first memory" and his parents divorced when Howard was three. Afterwards, Howard lived with his mother. Howard was diagnosed with Tourette syndrome and OCD when he was in the sixth grade.

In 1991, before Howard was a teenager, Tim Mulqueen, a one-time assistant coach for the U.S. under-17 soccer team, saw Howard's potential at a single $25 soccer coaching session. He took Howard under his wing, offering him free soccer coaching. When Howard was 14 and 15 years old, Peter Mellor, the former professional goalkeeper who was coaching for the United States Soccer Federation and writing the curriculum for the first U.S. Soccer National Goalkeeping License for coaches, saw the 14-year-old Howard in an Olympic Development Player camp, identified him as a star of the future, and placed him in the Olympic Development Program. Mellor also helped Howard obtain his work permit appeal after he joined Manchester United from the MetroStars in 2003.

Howard attended North Brunswick Township High School. Howard proved a star not only in soccer as a midfielder, but also on the basketball court, where he averaged 15 points per game and helped bring his team to the state finals in his senior year. During high school, he played for Central Jersey Cosmos. In 1995, Howard was part of the U.S. under-17 squad.

Club career
In 1997, Mulqueen became the coach of the North Jersey Imperials, a team in the United Systems of Independent Soccer Leagues (USISL), and served as the goalkeeping coach for Major League Soccer (MLS)'s MetroStars; he considered Howard for a position on the Imperials. Howard signed with the Imperials and played in his first professional game before graduating from high school. He notched six appearances with the North Jersey Imperials.

MetroStars
Howard was brought up to the MetroStars by Mulqueen, who at the time was the MetroStars' goalkeeping coach.

Howard was victorious in his MLS debut with the MetroStars on August 18, 1998, making five saves in a 4–1 win over Colorado at Giants Stadium (his only appearance of the year). He later played in one game with the Nike Project-40 Team, a 3–1 win over the Staten Island Vipers at Giants Stadium on May 6, 1998.

With the MetroStars during the 1999 MLS season, Howard made eight starts in nine contests. Howard had a 1.58 GAA and won just one match in a season in which the Metros won just seven games. He also spent most of the international season with the United States Under-20 team, leaving the club to compete in the 1999 FIFA World Youth Championship in April and the 1999 Pan American Games in July.

Howard posted a 5–2–2 record with a 1.59 GAA in 2000, splitting time between the MetroStars and the United States Olympic team, also winning all three of his U.S. Open Cup starts that season.

Howard won the 2001 MLS Goalkeeper of the Year award, recording 146 saves and finishing the year with a 1.33 GAA, four shutouts, and a 13–10–3 record. He also received the MLS Humanitarian of the Year Award.

Howard played in 27 of 28 regular season games in 2002 for the MetroStars, recording four shutouts. He was named to the MLS Best XI for the second straight season. Before leaving the MetroStars in 2003, he appeared in thirteen games and had three clean sheets as the club challenged for first place during the season's first half.

Manchester United
Manchester United paid a US$4 million transfer fee to sign Howard in the middle of the 2003 MLS season, and he replaced Fabien Barthez as the club's first-choice goalkeeper.

Howard started off very well at Manchester United, saving the decisive penalty in the Community Shield against Arsenal. Other notable performances followed, including Bolton Wanderers and a home FA Cup tie victory over Manchester City. In March 2004, however, Howard's poor parry handed a last minute goal to Porto, eliminating United from the UEFA Champions League. The error appeared to shatter Howard's confidence and he was replaced by Roy Carroll. After a period of rest, Howard reclaimed his starting position ahead of Carroll for the 2004 FA Cup Final, picking up a winner's medal. He was the second American player to collect a winner's medal in the FA Cup, after Julian Sturgis of Wanderers in the 1873 final. Howard was also named in the PFA Best XI in his first season at Manchester United.

In Howard's second season with Manchester United, he started poorly, making several errors and was dropped again for Carroll. After Carroll made several errors as well, Howard regained the starting position but his performances were unconvincing, leading to Carroll regaining his place again, playing in the FA Cup final defeat to Arsenal.

At the end of the 2004–05 season, Howard signed a new contract, which was to run until 2009. In the summer of 2005, Manchester United released both of his competitors for the goalkeeper position – Ricardo López Felipe and Carroll. However, they also bought experienced Dutch goalkeeper Edwin van der Sar from Fulham soon after.

Everton

Howard joined Everton on loan for the 2006–07 season and made his debut for the club against Watford on the opening day of the Premier League season. He signed a permanent deal with the club in February 2007 for a fee reported to be worth around £3 million.

Howard made his 100th appearance for Everton against West Ham United, on November 8, 2008. On April 19, 2009, in the FA Cup semi final, he saved two penalties against his former club Manchester United in a penalty shoot-out to send Everton to the final against Chelsea. During the 2008–09 Premier League season, Howard set the club record for most league match clean sheets in a season. Howard started the 2009–10 Premier League season with four consecutive clean sheets, including away to Portsmouth where he helped his team secure a 1–0 win. Howard saved a Jermain Defoe penalty in injury time to help his side draw 2–2 with Tottenham Hotspur on December 6, 2009. Howard captained Everton for the first time in a 3–3 draw with Chelsea at Stamford Bridge on December 12, 2009.

During the 2011–12 Premier League season, Howard scored his first goal in professional soccer in a 2–1 defeat to Bolton Wanderers. His wind-assisted 101-yard clearance at Goodison Park made him only the fourth goalkeeper to score in a Premier League match since its formation in 1992. He described his goal as "cruel" and refused to celebrate out of sympathy/respect for his beaten opposite number, Ádám Bogdán.

In March 2012, Howard agreed a new contract to keep him at the club until the summer of 2016. On March 2, 2013, Howard's run of 210 consecutive Premier League appearances dating back to September 2007 came to an end as he missed a game against Reading with a finger injury. He was two games short of equalling Neville Southall's club record. In May, Howard kept his 100th clean sheet for Everton in a 0–0 draw against Liverpool in the Merseyside derby.

On December 26, Howard was sent off in a 1–0 defeat to Sunderland, which ended Everton's hopes of remaining an entire calendar year unbeaten at home. In April 2014, Everton extended Howard's contract by two years until 2018.

On February 19, 2016, Everton manager Roberto Martínez confirmed Howard was expected to serve as the backup to Joel Robles. Howard had recently been affected by a knee injury and a loss of form. Before his final match with the club, Howard made a speech before the fans, stating, "I will remain an Evertonian for life. This will always be my team, my club."

Colorado Rapids
On March 20, 2016, it was announced that Howard would return to MLS, signing a three-and-a-half-year deal with the Colorado Rapids and becoming available when the MLS transfer window opens on July 4. On June 28, Howard was given the number 1 jersey as he appeared in his first press conference with the club. On November 6, 2016, Howard saved two penalty kicks – with a third also being sent off the crossbar – against the LA Galaxy to send Colorado to the Western Conference Championship.

On January 22, 2019, Howard announced the 2019 Major League Soccer season would be his final season as a professional player. He retired in October 2019.

Memphis 901
On March 4, 2020, Howard announced his return to professional soccer, signing a playing contract with Memphis 901 FC in the USL Championship, where he also serves as sporting director and minority owner.

International career

Howard represented the United States under-20 national team at the 1999 FIFA World Youth Championship in Nigeria, playing in group stage victories over England and Cameroon, before a loss in the Round of 16 against Spain.

In July 1999, Howard was called up for the United States under-23 national team for the 1999 Pan American Games tournament. The United States ended the tournament with a bronze medal having overcome Canada in the Bronze medal match.

Howard was used as a backup to Brad Friedel at the 2000 Summer Olympics. On March 10, 2002, he received his first senior cap, against Ecuador. On May 2, 2006, Howard was named as one of three goalkeepers on the United States roster for the 2006 FIFA World Cup in Germany, but served as a backup to Kasey Keller. Howard became the team's first choice goalkeeper under Bob Bradley and started in the 2007 CONCACAF Gold Cup final, a 2–1 win over Mexico.

Howard was the starting goalkeeper for the 2009 FIFA Confederations Cup, including the semi-final in which the United States upset Spain, then the number one-ranked team in the world. Howard's eight saves earned him his first clean sheet of the tournament and the first shutout of the Spanish side since 2007. Following the United States' second-place finish in the tournament, Howard was awarded the Golden Glove for best goalkeeper.

Howard was the starting goalkeeper for the 2010 World Cup, in South Africa, and turned in a man of the match performance against England in his World Cup debut. Howard's distribution to Landon Donovan led to the game-winning goal of the final group match against Algeria, giving the United States passage into the round of 16. During the United States' round of 16 game against Ghana, Howard conceded two goals in a 2–1 loss.

After Mexico defeated the United States to win the 2011 Gold Cup Final, Howard made a controversial statement regarding the post-match ceremony. The trophy presentation was conducted entirely in Spanish, despite the tournament being held in the United States. Howard went on to say that it was a "disgrace" and commented further that if the final had been in Mexico City and the United States had won, the ceremony would not have been made in English.

On June 7, 2014, in the buildup to the 2014 World Cup, Howard received his 100th cap for the United States in a 2–1 defeat of Nigeria. On June 22, Howard was named man of the match for his display during the United States' 2–2 draw with Portugal; his most notable save was a reaction stop to deny Éder, having previously diverted Nani's shot onto the post.

On July 1, Howard was again awarded man of the match, despite the United States losing 2–1 to Belgium after extra time in the round of 16. During the match, he broke the record for most saves in a World Cup match with 15. After breaking this record, his performance was celebrated worldwide on the internet, with the hashtag #ThingsTimHowardCouldSave trending on Twitter.

Following the World Cup, in August 2014, Howard asked U.S. men's national team coach Jürgen Klinsmann to allow him to take a break from international soccer until September 2015; as a result, he missed the 2015 Gold Cup. He was called up again in August 2015, for the team's friendly against Peru on September 4, at RFK Stadium.

Howard was a member of the team that won the 2017 Gold Cup. However, following to national team's failure to qualify for the 2018 World Cup later that year, after a surprise 2–1 away defeat to Trinidad and Tobago on October 10, he was no longer capped at international level. With 121 appearances, he is the most capped goalkeeper in U.S. men's national team history.

Personal life
Born to a Hungarian mother, Howard also holds a Hungarian passport. He is divorced from Laura Cianciola Howard, with whom he has two children. He is a devout Christian and has said, "The most important thing in my life is Christ. He's more important to me than winning or losing or whether I'm playing or not. Everything else is just a bonus." He is also involved with Athletes in Action, a ministry arm of Campus Crusade for Christ.

Howard was named MLS Humanitarian of the Year in 2001 for his work with children with Tourette syndrome, and was added to the New Jersey Tourette Syndrome Association Board of Directors in the same year. In 2014, the U.S. Tourette Syndrome Association described him as the "most notable individual with Tourette syndrome around the world" when he was deemed a "Champion of Hope" for the "tremendous courage he displayed in sharing his story on an international platform, educating the public on a disorder that is so seldom talked about, and encouraging young people living with TS to speak out about their experiences".

In 2014, Howard showed off his arm and torso tattoos for PETA's "Ink, Not Mink" anti-fur campaign.

Publications
Howard's autobiography, The Keeper: A Life of Saving Goals and Achieving Them, was co-authored with Ali Benjamin and published in 2014. It describes his career and his life with Tourette syndrome and OCD. In the book, Howard says that his neurological makeup gave him an enhanced perception and an ability to hyper-focus that contributed to his success on the field. The New York Times book review said that "few are cooler or quicker than Mr. Howard" and that "the story is good, but reading it require[s] a certain tolerance for sports clichés". The Chicago Tribune describes Howard as the "rarest of creatures – an American soccer hero", adding that the book has "exciting recollections" and that Howard is a "gracious narrator, though here and there he engages in mild score-settling".

Club ownership
In September 2018, Howard became part-owner of English fifth-tier club Dagenham & Redbridge and American second-tier club Memphis 901. It was announced in December 2019 that Howard had taken over as sporting director at Memphis 901, and that he was already handling roster management for the club. Also, in October 2019 it was announced that Howard would be the first international ambassador in the United States for former club Everton.

Career statistics

Club

International

Honors
Manchester United
FA Cup: 2003–04; runner-up: 2004–05
Football League Cup: 2005–06
FA Community Shield: 2003

Everton
FA Cup runner-up: 2008–09

United States
CONCACAF Gold Cup: 2007, 2017
FIFA Confederations Cup runner-up: 2009

Individual
MLS Goalkeeper of the Year: 2001
MLS All-Star: 2001, 2002, 2017
PFA Team of the Year: 2003–04 Premier League
U.S. Soccer Athlete of the Year: 2008, 2014
MLS All-Star MVP: 2009
FIFA Confederations Cup Golden Glove: 2009
CONCACAF Gold Cup Best Save: 2011
CONCACAF Men's Goalkeeper of the Year: 2013, 2014, 2015
Fútbol de Primera Player of the Year: 2014
CONCACAF Best XI: 2015

See also
 List of men's footballers with 100 or more international caps

Notes

References

General references
 Staff (April 2006) "Tim Howard 1979–" Biography Today 15(2): pp. 60–70
 Biography from Current Biography (2005), The H. W. Wilson Company.

External links

 
 
 
 

1979 births
Living people
American people of Hungarian descent
People from North Brunswick, New Jersey
African-American soccer players
Soccer players from New Jersey
American soccer players
Association football goalkeepers
North Jersey Imperials players
New York Red Bulls players
MLS Pro-40 players
Manchester United F.C. players
Everton F.C. players
Colorado Rapids players
Memphis 901 FC players
USL Second Division players
Major League Soccer players
A-League (1995–2004) players
Premier League players
Major League Soccer All-Stars
Designated Players (MLS)
United States men's youth international soccer players
United States men's under-20 international soccer players
United States men's under-23 international soccer players
Olympic soccer players of the United States
United States men's international soccer players
Footballers at the 2000 Summer Olympics
2003 FIFA Confederations Cup players
2006 FIFA World Cup players
2007 CONCACAF Gold Cup players
2009 FIFA Confederations Cup players
2010 FIFA World Cup players
2011 CONCACAF Gold Cup players
2014 FIFA World Cup players
Copa América Centenario players
2017 CONCACAF Gold Cup players
CONCACAF Gold Cup-winning players
FIFA Century Club
American expatriate soccer players
American expatriate sportspeople in England
Expatriate footballers in England
American Christians
People with obsessive–compulsive disorder
People with Tourette syndrome
FA Cup Final players
Pan American Games bronze medalists for the United States
Footballers at the 1999 Pan American Games
Medalists at the 1999 Pan American Games
Pan American Games medalists in football